HMS Dagger is a  fast patrol boat of the British Royal Navy. She is a fast patrol boat with a maximum speed around  designed for sovereignty protection and coastal security duties. She arrived in Gibraltar in April 2022

Along with HMS Cutlass, she is replacing the  patrol vessels in Gibraltar. The Scimitar-class boats were deployed in Gibraltar after 2003 but were withdrawn from the territory in 2020, being then replaced by two Archer-class boats on an interim basis until the arrival of the Cutlass-class vessels.

On 14 July 2022, she was commissioned into the Royal Navy.

See also
 British Forces Gibraltar

References

2021 ships
Ships built in the United Kingdom
Cutlass-class patrol vessels